A Baltimore Clipper is a fast sailing ship historically built on the mid-Atlantic seaboard of the United States of America, especially at the port of Baltimore, Maryland.  An early form of clipper, the name is most commonly applied to two-masted schooners and brigantines. These vessels may also be referred to as Baltimore Flyers.

History
Baltimore clippers were built as small, fast sailing vessels for trade around the coastlines of the United States and with the Caribbean Islands. Their hull-lines tended to be very sharp, with a "V"-shaped cross-section below the waterline and strongly raked stem, stern posts, and masts. The origins of the type are unknown but certainly hulls conforming to the concept were being built in Jamaica and Bermuda, with the hull of the ocean-going Bermuda sloop broader than the Jamaican and deeper than the American design. By the late 18th century the Baltimore configuration was not only popular in the United States as merchant craft but in Britain as well.

The National Maritime Museum, Greenwich has a one-page drawing labeled "A DRAWING OF HIS MAJESTY'S ARM'D SCHOONER BERBICE, THE 5TH AUG 1789" that comprises a sheer plan, body lines, deck plan, lines, and a view of her stern. These drawings of  represent the earliest draught of what became known as the Baltimore Clipper.

The Royal Navy found the schooners of only limited usefulness during the French Revolutionary Wars and Napoleonic Wars because they were unstable gun platforms due to their design for extreme speed compared to their size. Furthermore, the schooner rig does not allow sails to be backed, creating a disadvantage in maneuverability in battle. They were adopted after the wars to pursue slave ships.

They were especially suited to moving low-density, high value perishable cargoes such as slaves, and in that trade operated as far afield as the west coast of Africa.

Similar merchant vessels were given letters of marque and served as privateers during the War of Independence. During the War of 1812, merchant schooners were too small and slow to escape the British blockade, and larger faster more heavily armed purpose built privateer Baltimore clippers were developed.  The most famous of these larger vessels were the privateers Chasseur, Prince de Neufchatel and General Armstrong. Prince de Neufchatel resisted an attack by a four fold numerically superior force in the boats of HMS Endymion and Chasseur alone captured more enemy ships than the entire US Navy during the war. Nevertheless, most privateers during the war were of the smaller type and served as merchant ships despite being given letters of marque. As a result, more privateers were taken by the British blockade of 1813 than ever took a prize themselves.

The Baltimore Clippers demise in use came about not because of outdated capabilities but from people not wanting to be associated with the less than admirable activities it had become known for like illegally importing slaves after the Act Prohibiting Importation of Slaves in 1807 and raiding in South America.

One particularly famous Baltimore Clipper, and one of the last of the type in commercial service, was the schooner Vigilant that traded around the Danish Caribbean islands for over a century before sinking in a hurricane on September 12, 1928.  She was believed to have been built in the 1790s.

Famous Baltimore Clippers
Vigilant, 1794, one of the first and most famous Baltimore clippers. She sailed for over 130 years, bringing mail and passengers to ports in the Danish West Indies and around the Virgin Islands.
Chasseur, 1812, a fine example of Baltimore Clipper built by Thomas Kemp. She was commanded by Captain Thomas Boyle, an American privateer during the War of 1812.
Lynx, 1812, an excellent example of a Baltimore clipper built by Thomas Kemp for the War of 1812.
 , the captured slave ship, originally built as a slave ship, but ended up freeing several hundred slaves in service of the West Africa Squadron.
 Ann McKim, 1833, one of the first "true" clippers. She was built by Kennard & Williamson.

In popular culture
Capt. Jack Aubrey uses a captured Baltimore Clipper, the Ringle, as his tender in the Patrick O'Brian novels The Commodore and The Yellow Admiral.  The ship is named after the American writer who brought the clippers to O'Brian's attention.

Modern replicas
Modern replicas of an early 19th-century Baltimore Clipper type include the ill-fated Pride of Baltimore, her replacement, Pride of Baltimore II, Californian, La Amistad,  Shenandoah as well as the Liberty Clipper and the privateer Lynx.

References

 
Merchant sailing ship types
+Baltimore Clipper
+Baltimore Clipper
Transportation in Baltimore
 
Age of Sail ships of the United States
Tall ships